PlantAmnesty is a non-profit education and advocacy group based in Seattle, Washington.

PlantAmnesty was founded by arborist Cass Turnbull on October 22, 1987, as a mock protest group intended to educate the public about the problems associated with pruning techniques which are biologically harmful to plants and counter productive to the goals of landscape design and management; most notably tree topping.  The stated mission of the organization "is to end the senseless torture and mutilation of trees and shrubs."  PlantAmnesty also provides an "adopt-a-plant" exchange for unwanted, healthy plants.

References

External links
 Plant Amnesty

Horticultural organizations based in the United States
Organizations established in 1987
Organizations based in Seattle